Liberty Hill is a scattered unincorporated community in Kershaw County, South Carolina, United States. Liberty Hill has a post office with ZIP code 29074, which opened on January 19, 1818. There is also a fire lookout tower there, and a church, and a few houses spread along the main road, but otherwise no businesses or services.

Parts of the community are included in the Liberty Hill Historic District, which is listed on the National Register of Historic Places.

References

Unincorporated communities in Kershaw County, South Carolina
Unincorporated communities in South Carolina